Monardella siskiyouensis is an uncommon species of flowering plant in the mint family known by the common name Siskiyou monardella.

It is endemic to the southern Klamath Mountains of California, where it grows in chaparral and woodland habitat.

Description
Monardella siskiyouensis is a perennial herb producing an erect, glandular and hairy stem lined with pairs of oppositely arranged oval leaves. The inflorescence is a head of several flowers blooming in a small cup of rough-haired, leaflike bracts. The purple flowers have five lobes and protruding stamens.

External links
 Calflora Database: Monardella villosa ssp. villosa (Coyote mint) — formerly Monardella siskiyouensis.
 Jepson Manual eFlora (TJM2) treatment of Monardella villosa ssp. villosa (coyote mint) — formerly Monardella siskiyouensis.
 USDA Plants Profile for Monardella villosa ssp. villosa (coyote mint) — formerly Monardella siskiyouensis.
 UC CalPhotos gallery of Monardella villosa ssp. villosa (coyote mint) — formerly Monardella siskiyouensis.

siskiyouensis
Endemic flora of California
Flora of the Klamath Mountains
Natural history of the California chaparral and woodlands
~
Flora without expected TNC conservation status